Phularwan , is a city located in the Sargodha District of Punjab province, Pakistan. It is a part of the tehsil of Bhalwal. It is the terminus of a branch of the North-Western railway.

Location
Latitude 32° 21' 20.52" N (32.3557), Longitude 73° 00' 44.67" E (73.012408), Phularwan is located on the Lahore-Islamabad motorway (M2) at the Salam interchange in Sargodha District. The town is connected to Sargodha Gujrat Road from two different places from Salam Chowk Via Bhera Phularwan Road, distance is approximately 3 km and secondly from Chakian Phularwan via Phularwan Gujrat Road distance is 4 km. The town's importance increased due to the motorway passing near Phularwan. Phularwan is 50 km from the district capital Sargodha. Now it takes only two hours to reach Phularwan from Lahore, Islamabad, and Faisalabad. A famous depot of the Pakistan Army, Mona depot, is 12 km from Phularwan. Nearby places include Rattokala, village Sidhowal, Dhori and Salam.

Trade and history 
HISTORY 

Phularwan is so rich in history it's an historical place in the heart of punjab even before the partition of the subcontinent Phularwan was knows as prominent market for different goods many Sikhs families were living here with pride but after the creation of pakistan  on 14 August 1947 all Sikhs left their born place leaving most of their belonging behind and migrate to india even today there are many old houses and buildings in Phularwan which shows its cultural significance. In Phularwan long before the creation of pakistan there was naberdar system in which naberdar was responsible to resolve problems of residents.

Phularwan is known for its Kinnoo production (a special kind of orange). It is an important centre of trade, with manufacture of cotton goods, metal-work, carving, etc. A large amount of sugarcane is produced in this area. However, a large number of furniture makers are adding to commercial activity as the furniture market is the biggest after Sargodha city, in Sargodha district.

Paddy (Rice), Wheat, Cotton, Sesame are also produced significantly, All these crops are traded in local Grain Market.

Nearby areas
 Chak No 1 NB Ghakra
Village Sidhowal
Ratto Kala railway station
 Bhera
 Davispur
 Miani

References

Populated places in Sargodha District